West Somerset is a local government district in the English county of Somerset. In the United Kingdom, the term listed building refers to a building or other structure officially designated as being of special architectural, historical or cultural significance; Grade I structures are those considered to be "buildings of exceptional interest". Listing was begun by a provision in the Town and Country Planning Act 1947. Once listed, severe restrictions are imposed on the modifications allowed to a building's structure or its fittings. In England, the authority for listing under the Planning (Listed Buildings and Conservation Areas) Act 1990 rests with Historic England, a non-departmental public body sponsored by the Department for Digital, Culture, Media and Sport; local authorities have a responsibility to regulate and enforce the planning regulations.

The largest centres of population are the coastal towns of Minehead and Watchet. The council's administrative headquarters are in the village of Williton.

There are 33 Grade I listed buildings in West Somerset. The oldest is either Culbone Church, one of the smallest churches in England, and pre-Norman in origin, or Tarr Steps, which may originate in the Bronze Age, although other sources date them from around 1400. Dunster has the greatest concentration of Grade I listed buildings, including Dunster Castle, which was built in 1617 on a site which had supported a castle for the previous 600 years; the Yarn Market, which was built in 1609;  Gallox Bridge, which dates from the 15th century and the Priory Church of St George which is predominantly from the 15th century but includes part of the earlier church on the same site. Other sites include manor houses such as the medieval buildings at Nettlecombe Court and Orchard Wyndham. Somerset has many religious structures, most of which are from the Norman or medieval eras. Some of the churches are part of the Somerset towers, a collection mostly spireless Gothic church towers.

Buildings

|}

See also
 List of Grade I listed buildings in Somerset
 List of towers in Somerset

Notes

References

External links
 West Somerset Council listed building information

 
West